Renée van Laarhoven (born 15 October 1997) is a Dutch field hockey player. Van Laarhoven is currently playing for SCHC.

Van Laarhoven made her debut for the Netherlands national team on the 17th of November 2018 in a match against Japan during the 2018 Champions Trophy in Changzhou, China. The Dutch team, with van Laarhoven, won the gold medal at this tournament.

References

1997 births
Living people
Dutch female field hockey players
Female field hockey defenders
SV Kampong players
21st-century Dutch women